Adam Jarosław Kułach (10 January 1965 – 1 September 2022) was a Polish diplomat; ambassador of Poland to Saudi Arabia (2004–2010) and ambassador of the European Union to Saudi Arabia (2012–2016) and Djibouti (2016–2020).

Life 
Kułach was born in Lubliniec, and grew up in Sosnowiec. He graduated from political sciences at the Moscow State Institute of International Relations, Faculty of Oriental Studies (1991). He studied also at the Polish Institute of International Affairs (Foreign Service Post-Graduate Studies, 1992), and University of Warsaw (Post-Graduate Studies in Law & Economy of European Communities, 1992; Post-Graduate Management Studies, 2001). 

In 1992, he joined the Ministry of Foreign Affairs of Poland. He was junior desk officer for Iraq, Kuwait, and Saudi Arabia at the Department of Africa, Asia, Australia & South Sea Islands. From 1993 to 1999 he was Second and then First Secretary as well as Consul at the Embassy of Poland in Tripoli. For next four years he held the post of desk officer for Iraq, Saudi Arabia, Yemen, reaching the rank of Minister-counselor. In 2000 he became member of the Polish civil service. Between 2004 and 2010 he served as the ambassador of the Republic of Poland to the Kingdom of Saudi Arabia. Since 2005 he was accredited to the Sultanate of Oman, and, since 2009, the Republic of Yemen, as well. He returned to the MFA, being responsible for relations with Arab countries and Iran as deputy director of the Department of Africa and the Middle East; since February 2012 he was director of the Department. In August 2011 he became also Plenipotentiary of the Minister for North Africa. From October 2012 to September 2016 he was in Saudi Arabia, this time as an ambassador of the European Union, accredited also to Bahrain, Kuwait, Oman, Qatar, and since 2016 the Organisation of Islamic Cooperation. In 2016, he ended his term and was nominated EU ambassador to Djibouti and the Intergovernmental Authority on Development. He ended his term in 2020.

In 2013, he received Knight's Cross of the Order of Polonia Restituta for creating Polish policy towards the Middle East after the Arab Spring.

Besides Polish, Kułach was speaking English, Russian, Arabic, and French.

He rested on the Northern Communal Cemetery, Warsaw.

References 

1965 births
2022 deaths
Ambassadors of Poland to Saudi Arabia
Ambassadors of the European Union to Djibouti
Ambassadors of the European Union to Saudi Arabia
Knights of the Order of Polonia Restituta
Moscow State Institute of International Relations alumni
People from Lubliniec
Polish officials of the European Union